The Crimson Beech (also known as the Cass House) is a house designed by Frank Lloyd Wright located in the Lighthouse Hill neighborhood of the New York City borough of Staten Island. Its original owners, Catherine and William Cass, had it manufactured by Marshall Erdman in kit form in Madison, Wisconsin and shipped to Staten Island where it was erected in 1959. It is the only residence designed by Wright in New York City and one of eleven Marshall Erdman Prefab Houses that were built. The particular model is known as the Prefab #1.

The house features a combined kitchen and family room, a sunken living room with a cathedral ceiling, and a gallery that leads to four bedrooms. All interior walls are paneled in Philippine mahogany, with raised horizontal bands set about a foot apart.

The house is a long and low L shape, with wide hip roofs. The exterior, red brick and largely clad in cream-colored Masonite, is similarly striped with redwood battens that emphasize the low-slung lines. The front of the house has one story, while the rear, because of the sloping site, has two. The roof is made of terne.

At the time of construction, the components of the house cost $20,000 and assembly cost a further $35,000. The house was declared a landmark in August 1990 and the original owners resided there until 1999 when it was sold. It remains in private hands.

See also
List of New York City Designated Landmarks in Staten Island
National Register of Historic Places listings in Richmond County, New York

References

External links
 External Views of the House
 Article about the house reprinted from the Staten Island Advance
 A Frank Lloyd Wright House In New York City
 Landmarks Preservation Commission application
 Latourette, Lighthouses and Wright
Photo of Crimson Beech
 Another photo of Crimson Beech
 Interview with Cretellas (owners since 2004) and both exterior and interior photographs

Frank Lloyd Wright buildings
Modernist architecture in New York City
New York City Designated Landmarks in Staten Island
Houses in Staten Island
Houses completed in 1959